Dolejší is a Czech surname. Notable people with the surname include:

 Břetislav Dolejší (1928–2010), Czech footballer
 Jitka Dolejší (born 1958), Czech archer

See also
 

Czech-language surnames
Toponymic surnames
Surnames of Czech origin